Bolton Olympic F.C. was an English association football club from Bolton in Lancashire.

History
The club was founded in 1876 under the name Bolton St George's.  After the 1878-79 season the club changed its name to Bolton Olympic.  The club took part in the first Lancashire Senior Cup in 1879-80, losing 5-4 to Lynwood F.C. of Darwen in the first round, having been 4-3 up with six minutes to go but conceding two late goals via scrimmages. The match that was "very disagreeable throughout, owing to the unseemly disputes which arose among the players and the interference of the onlookers, who behaved very rudely to the visitors, in several instances almost getting from words to blows", which was blamed in part on the Lynwood pitch being "in very bad condition".  

The Olympians reached the second round in 1880-81, but were eliminated by Great Lever after three ties; the first a draw, the second an Olympian win, but voided because the goalkeeper had not been a club member for the month required by the regulations, and the third a win for Great Lever.  The Olympians protested that one of the goals was too narrow, but the discrepancy was under one-eighth of an inch.

FA Cup

The club entered the FA Cup in 1882-83 and 1883-84, losing in the first round on both occasions.

The Olympians' first Cup tie was against Eagley at Tonge Fold.  Although the Olympians were at home, the majority of the crowd of 300 was from Eagley.  A remarkable game saw the Olympians open the scoring, but they were never ahead in the match again, losing to the unlikely score of 7-4.

The 9-0 defeat by Bolton Wanderers in the second Cup outing seems to have been a mortal blow for the club, the final straw being the Lancashire Football Association rejecting a protest made by the Olympians against Witton following a defeat in the Lancashire Senior Cup, as there are no reported matches for the club after the end of the season.  The club's last act seems to have been its representation at a Football Association meeting in 1885 which considered the legalisation of professionalism.

Colours

The club's colours were white jersey, blue knickers, and black and white hose.

References

Defunct football clubs in England
Defunct football clubs in Lancashire
Association football clubs established in the 19th century